The Magandang Balita Biblia is a Christian Bible in the Tagalog language, first published by the Philippine Bible Society in 1973. It follows the tradition of the Good News Bible, however, it is not a direct translation but rather only a parallel translation of it.

Sources and bases
According to the Philippine Bible Society, the translators used the Masoretic Text, particularly the third edition of Biblia Hebraica edited by Rudolf Kittel (published in 1937), as the main basis of their Old Testament. However, when there was no satisfactory text that could be used as a basis, the PBS opted to use any of the oldest versions available. These versions are those written in Greek, Syriac or Latin. However, when there still was no other version available, the committee opted to use a modern translation that they deemed suitable.

For the Deuterocanonical Books, the translators used the Septuagint, particularly the edition of Alfred Rahlfs (published in 1949). However, for comparative purposes, the PBS used the first critical edition of the Biblia Sacra prepared by Robert Weber (published in 1969).

When it comes to the New Testament, the translators used the third edition of the United Bible Societies Greek New Testament (UBS3, published in 1975), save for some parts that were based on a variant reading supported by one or more Greek manuscripts.

See also

Bible translations into the languages of the Philippines

References

External links
 Philippine Bible Society
 Magandang Balita Biblia (2012 edition) at Bible Gateway (also available with Deuterocanonicals)

Bible translations into the languages of the Philippines
Tagalog language
1973